is a Japanese professional footballer who plays as an attacking midfielder for  club Kashima Antlers.

Club statistics

References

External links

Profile at Kashima Antlers

1992 births
Living people
Association football people from Gunma Prefecture
Japanese footballers
J1 League players
J2 League players
Roasso Kumamoto players
Kamatamare Sanuki players
Fagiano Okayama players
Kashiwa Reysol players
Kashima Antlers players
Association football forwards